Notable persons who were born, grew up, reside or lived in Saskatoon:

A
 Mark Abley – writer
 Hugh Alan Anderson (1933–2015) – Canadian politician and a Member of the Canadian Parliament
 Mel Angelstad – professional ice hockey player
 Colby Armstrong – former NHL hockey player, currently hockey analyst with Sportsnet
 Riley Armstrong – NHL hockey player with Detroit Red Wings
 Brent Ashton – former NHL hockey player

B
 Mike Babcock – Former head coach of the Canadian National Team and the NHL Toronto Maple Leafs 
 Lorne Babiuk – former director, VIDO-InterVac
 C. Donald Bateman – inventor of the ground proximity warning system (GPWS)
 Wade Belak (1976–2011) – former NHL player with Nashville Predators 
 Frederick E. Betts (1870–1942) – president of the Canadian Amateur Hockey Association
 Byron Bitz – NHL player with Florida Panthers
 Trevor Blackwell – entrepreneur
 Allan Blakeney – former Premier of Saskatchewan
 Derek Boogaard (1982–2011) – former NHL hockey player with New York Rangers 
 Dave Brown – former NHL player
 Sidney Buckwold –  former Mayor of Saskatoon
 Hy Buller (1926–1968) – All Star NHL ice hockey player
 Hugh Cairns (VC) – World War I soldier awarded the Victoria Cross
 Lorne Calvert - former Premier of Saskatchewan
 Steph Cameron - folk singer-songwriter
 Ethel Catherwood – Olympic medalist
 Emily Clark (ice hockey) – Ice Hockey Player | 2022 Beijing Olympics Gold Medalist and 2014 Sochi Olympics Silver medalist
 Kim Coates (born 1958) – Canadian/American actor, Sons of Anarchy; born in Saskatoon 
 Renée Coleman – Canadian actress who has appeared in several TV shows and movies

D
 Mark Dacey – 2004 Brier Champion
 Joyce Davidson - TV personality

E
 Michael Eklund – actor
 Dan Ellis – NHL goaltender with Florida Panthers
 Shane Endicott – former NHL hockey player
 Todd Ewen - Former NHL player

F
 Sylvia Fedoruk – scientist, former Lieutenant Governor of Saskatchewan
 Larry Fisher – murderer of Gail Miller
 Don Freed – singer/songwriter
 Dawna Friesen – newscaster
 Pete Friesen – guitar player for Alice Cooper, Bruce Dickinson of Iron Maiden and The Almighty
 Gayleen Froese – author
 Wes Funk – writer

G
 Michael Garnett – former NHL goaltender with the Atlanta Thrashers
 Joanna Glass – playwright
 Glenda Goertzen – author
 Bruce Gordon
 Herb Grosch – Computer Scientist
 Tom Grummett – comic book artist
 Eric Gryba – NHL player with the Edmonton Oilers
 Lyell Gustin – music educator

H
 Brandon Hagel – professional ice hockey player
 Chris Hajt – professional ice hockey player, Lukko
 Emmett Hall – former Supreme Court Justice
 Stu Hart (1915–2003) – professional wrestling patriarch
 Ray Hnatyshyn – former Governor General of Canada
 Robert Hodges - PhD in Biochemistry, former Olympic speed skater (1968, 1972)
 Gustin House – Lyell Gustin, decades-long teacher of many eminent pianists province-wide
 Gordie Howe (1928–2016) – NHL and WHA hockey player
 Bill Hunter (1920–2002) – ice hockey entrepreneur
 Jorgen Hus - Saskatchewan Roughriders Football player

J
 Susan Jacks (ne: Pesklevits) – singer-songwriter, producer, member of The Poppy Family

K
 Miklos Kanitz – Holocaust survivor
 Ryan Keller – NHL hockey player, Ottawa Senators
 Dave King – university and NHL hockey coach
 Ken Kirzinger – actor and stuntman, famous for playing Jason Voorhees in Freddy vs. Jason
Joseph Kotlar (comedian) 
Darcy Kuemper – goalie for the NHL franchise Washington Capitals
 Kaylyn Kyle – member of the Canada women's national soccer team

L 
 Annette Lapointe (born 1978) – writer
 Regan Lauscher (born 1980) – Canadian luge champion
 James Le Jeune (1910–1983) – painter, born in Saskatoon
 Catriona Le May Doan (born 1970) – speed skater, Olympic medalist
 Chelazon Leroux - Drag performer seen on Canada's Drag Race (season 3)
 Alison Lang (born 1961) - Canadian Olympic Basketball player
 Curtis Leschyshyn (born 1969) – former NHL hockey player
 Ernest Lindner (1897–1988) - painter
 Trey Lyles (born 1995) – professional basketball player
 Vic Lynn (1925–2010) – ice hockey player
 Taylor Leier (born 1994) - NHL hockey player

M
 Stony Mac - Drag Performer - Appeared on Call Me Mother (season 2)
 Duncan MacPherson (1966–1989) – ice hockey player
 Keith Magnuson (died 2003) – former NHL hockey player, Chicago Blackhawks
 Tyler Mane – former pro wrestler and actor
 Yann Martel – Booker Prize winning author
 Mike Maurer – CFL fullback
Daniel Mason – novelist and physician 
 Chris McAllister – former NHL hockey player
 Shane Meier – actor
 David Milgaard – falsely accused/convicted/imprisoned for murder of Gail Miller
 Gail Miller – victim of murder by Larry Fisher, for which David Milgaard was falsely convicted
 Joni Mitchell – musician, artist
 Allan Moffat – racing car driver (based in Australia). 12 Hours of Sebring winner and four-time winner of the Australian Touring Car Championship and Bathurst 1000
 Keith Morrison – Dateline NBC Correspondent
 Farley Mowat – novelist
 Jasmin Mozaffari – film director and screenwriter
 Alaa Murabit - doctor, award-winning global strategist and policymaker

N
 Carey Nelson – long-distance runner
 Darin Nesbitt – professor at Douglas College

P
 Lane Pederson – NHL player
 Michaela Pereira – HLN anchor
 Krista Phillips – professional basketball player (former University of Michigan Women's Basketball player)
 Rich Pilon – former NHL hockey player
 "Rowdy" Roddy Piper (Roderick Toombs) (died 2015) – professional wrestler and film actor

R
 Doug Redl – Canadian football player
 Scott Redl – Canadian football player
 Drew Remenda – TV colour analyst for the San Jose Sharks and radio show host
 Kyle Riabko – actor and musician
 Roy Romanow – former Premier of Saskatchewan
 Viola Roquette Drag performer
 Roddy Piper - actor and professional wrestler

S
 William Sarjeant – geology professor and author
 Brayden Schenn – NHL hockey player with St. Louis Blues
 Luke Schenn – NHL hockey player with Toronto Maple Leafs
 Brian Skrudland – former NHL hockey forward, two-time Stanley Cup Champion
 Arthur Slade – author
 Theresa Sokyrka – singer-songwriter, musician, and placed second on season 2 of "Canadian Idol" 
 Brent Sopel – NHL hockey player with Atlanta Thrashers
 Chandler Stephenson - NHL hockey player with Vegas Golden Knights
 Jarret Stoll – NHL hockey player with Los Angeles Kings
 Neil Stonechild – high-profile victim of an alleged starlight tour
 Joey Stylez (Joseph Laplante) – hip hop artist
 David Sutcliffe (born 1969) – actor
 Anne Szumigalski – poet

T
 Brianne Theisen-Eaton - twice World Athletics Championships silver medalist in heptathlon
 Gordon Tootoosis – First Nations actor
 Shannon Tweed – actress, wife of Gene Simmons of KISS

V
 Guy Vanderhaeghe – author
 Sugith Varughese – writer, director and actor
 Suzie Vinnick – folk/blues singer-songwriter and guitarist

W
 Cam Ward – NHL hockey goaltender, Chicago Blackhawks
 Ed Whalen – host and commentator, Stampede Wrestling
 Steven Woods – Quack.com co-founder, current Google Waterloo site director
 Henry Woolf – actor
 James Wright - ice hockey player, plays in the Swedish Hockey League for the Linköpings HC, formerly in the NHL for the Winnipeg Jets and the Tampa Bay Lightning
 Janet Wright (1945–2016) – actress and cast member of Corner Gas
 Larry Wruck, CFL player

See also
List of people from Prince Albert, Saskatchewan
List of people from Regina, Saskatchewan

References

 
Saskatoon
Saskatoon